Albert Hawkins (21 May 1886 – 1969) was a Welsh gymnast. He competed in the men's team all-around event at the 1908 Summer Olympics.

References

External links
 

1886 births
1969 deaths
Welsh male artistic gymnasts
Olympic gymnasts of Great Britain
Gymnasts at the 1908 Summer Olympics
Sportspeople from Abertillery